Blanco is a surname of Spanish origin, meaning "white". Notable people with the surname include:

General
Ana Blanco (born 1963), Spanish journalist and newscaster
 Andrés Eloy Blanco, Venezuelan poet and politician
Antonio Blanco (painter), Filipino painter
Antonio Blanco Freijeiro (1923-1991), Spanish archeologist and historian
 Augustin Blanco (1700-1725), Spanish pirate active in the Caribbean
Bartolomé Blanco (1914-1936), Spanish Catholic martyr
Carlos Blanco (writer) (born 1986), Spanish writer
Eduardo Blanco (actor), Spanish/Argentine actor
Eduardo Blanco (writer), Venezuelan writer and politician
Eduardo Blanco Amor, Galician Spanish writer and journalist
Francisco Manuel Blanco, Spanish friar and botanist
Griselda Blanco, Colombian drug lord
Herminio Blanco Mendoza, Mexican economist
Jackie Lou Blanco (born 1964), Filipina actress
Jorge Blanco (disambiguation), several people
José Blanco (cigar industrialist), Dominican cigar businessman
Joseph Blanco White, Spanish theologian and poet
Lua Blanco, Brazilian actress and singer
 Luis Blanco Lugo, Puerto Rican judge
 Pedro Blanco (slave trader) (1795–1854), Spanish slave trader
 Pedro Blanco López (1883–1919), Spanish pianist and academic
Richard Blanco (born 1968), American poet
Roberto Blanco (actor) (1903-1965), Argentine actor
 Rufino Blanco-Fombona, Venezuelan writer
Shanira Blanco, Puerto Rican model and TV presenter
Tomás Blanco (disambiguation), multiple people with the name
Victor Manuel Blanco, Puerto Rican astronomer
Yolanda Blanco (born 1954), Nicaraguan poet

Music
Benny Blanco (born 1988), American musician
Hugo Blanco (musician) (1940–2015), Venezuelan musician
 Juan Blanco (1919–2008), Cuban composer
 Mykki Blanco (born 1986), American rapper
Rico Blanco (born 1973), Filipino singer
Roberto Blanco (born 1937), German singer

Politicians
Alex Blanco, Dominican-American politician
Andrés Eloy Blanco, Venezuelan poet and politician
Antonio Guzmán Blanco, Venezuelan politician and former president
Carlos Blanco Galindo, interim president of Bolivia
Daniel Blanco Acevedo, Uruguayan politician and former deputy for Montevideo
Eduardo Blanco, Venezuelan history writer and politician
Hugo Blanco (born 1934), Peruvian politician
José Blanco López (born 1962), Spanish politician
José Luis Blanco Pajón, Mexican politician
Juan Carlos Blanco Acevedo, Uruguayan politician and former foreign minister
Juan Carlos Blanco Estradé, Uruguayan politician, former foreign minister, UN ambassador, and senator
Juan Carlos Blanco Fernández, Uruguayan politician and former foreign minister
José Luis Blanco Pajón (born 1956), Mexican politician
Kathleen Blanco (1942-2019), United States politician and former governor of Louisiana
Luis Carrero Blanco, Spanish politician and former prime minister
Manuel Blanco Encalada, Chilean politician and vice-admiral
Marco Antonio Garcia Blanco, Mexican diplomat
Miguel Ángel Blanco, Spanish politician assassinated in 1997
Otilio Ulate Blanco, Costa Rican politician and former president
Pedro Blanco Soto, (1795–1829), President of Bolivia for one week
Ramón Blanco y Erenas, Spanish governor of the Philippines and Cuba
Raymond Blanco (1935-2022), American educator, First Gentleman of Louisiana
Salvador Jorge Blanco (1926–2010), Dominican politician, writer and lawyer
Víctor Blanco, Mexican official and politician
Wilfrido Blanco, Costa Rican politician

Sports

Association football
Aitor Blanco, Spanish footballer
Alberto Blanco (footballer), Panamanian footballer
Borja Blanco Gil, Spanish futsal player
Carlos Blanco (footballer, born 1928), Spanish-Mexican footballer
Carlos Blanco (footballer, born 1996), Spanish footballer
Cuauhtémoc Blanco, Mexican footballer
Daniel Blanco, Argentine footballer
Elkin Blanco, Colombian footballer
Ismael Blanco, Argentine footballer
Kepa Blanco, Spanish footballer
Jonathan Blanco, Argentine footballer
Juan José Blanco, Uruguayan footballer
Léster Blanco, Salvadoran footballer
Manuel Blanco Rodríguez, Spanish footballer
Mauro Blanco, Bolivian footballer
Ramón Blanco Rodríguez, Spanish footballer
Raul Blanco, Argentine football coach
Rubén Blanco Veiga, Spanish footballer
Richard José Blanco, Venezuelan footballer
Sebastián Blanco, Argentine footballer
Sergio Blanco, Uruguayan footballer
Raúl González Blanco, Spanish footballer

Baseball
Andrés Eloy Blanco, Venezuelan baseball player
Dairon Blanco, Cuban baseball player
Dámaso Blanco, Venezuelan baseball player
Gregor Blanco, Venezuelan baseball player
Henry Blanco, Venezuelan baseball player
Ossie Blanco, Venezuelan baseball player
Ronel Blanco, Dominican baseball player
Tony Blanco, Dominican baseball player

Cycling
David Blanco, Spanish cyclist
Julio César Blanco, Venezuelan cyclist

Judo
Cecilia Blanco, Spanish judoka
Oiana Blanco, Spanish judoka
Giovanna Blanco, Venezuelan judoka

Track & field
José Luis Blanco, Spanish athlete
Marvin Blanco, Venezuelan athlete

Volleyball
Juan Carlos Blanco, Venezuelan volleyball player

Others
Alfonso Blanco (boxer), Venezuelan boxer
Galo Blanco, Spanish tennis player
Isabel Blanco, Norwegian handball player
Jesús Blanco, Argentine wrestler
Lorena Blanco, Peruvian badminton player
Maribel Blanco, Spanish triathlete
Maximo Blanco, Venezuelan martial artist
Saúl Blanco, Spanish basketball player
Serge Blanco, Venezuelan French rugby union player

Spanish-language surnames